Aelita, Do Not Pester Men! is a 1988 Soviet comedy film directed by Georgy Natanson.

Plot 
The film tells about an unusual and gullible woman who, in spite of everything, continues to believe that she will become happy.

Cast 
 Natalya Gundareva as Aelita
 Valentin Gaft as Skameikin
 Alexander Kuznetsov as Fedya Sidorov
 Valentin Smirnitskiy as Apokin
 Boris Shcherbakov as inspector
 Irina Shmeleva	 as 	chemical plant worker
 Georgy Martirosyan as companion of the actress
 Ella Nekrasova as chemical plant worker
 Klara Rumyanova as chemical plant worker
 Tamara Sovchi as episode

References

External links 
 

1988 films
1980s Russian-language films
Soviet comedy films
1988 comedy films
Mosfilm films